Hypleurochilus aequipinnis, the oyster blenny, is a species of combtooth blenny found in coral reefs in the western Atlantic ocean.  This species grows to a length of  TL.

References

aequipinnis
Fish described in 1861
Taxa named by Albert Günther